Neoregelia mcwilliamsii is a species of flowering plant in the genus Neoregelia. Its name is also spelt Neoregelia macwilliamsii.

Cultivars 
 Neoregelia 'Ivory'
 Neoregelia 'Jeffrey Block'
 Neoregelia 'Liz'
 Neoregelia 'Sassy'
 Neoregelia 'Ultima'
 Neoregelia 'Water Melon'
 Neoregelia 'Zacate'
 × Neomea 'Mundillo'

References 

BSI Cultivar Registry Retrieved 11 October 2009

mcwilliamsii